Mount Bob is a mountain located in the Catskill Mountains of New York north of Hobart. Jaclyn Hill is north of Mount Bob and Griffin Hill is to the south.

References

Bob
Bob